Marquis Ai of Cai (蔡哀侯) (died 675 BC), born Jī Xiànwǔ (姫獻舞), was the thirteenth ruler of the State of Cai from 695 BC to 675 BC.  He was the only known son of Marquis Huan of Cai (蔡桓侯), his predecessor.  His reign was a period of 20 years.  In the autumn of 684 BC, King Wen of Chu conquered the State of Cai and took the reigning Marquis as a prisoner of war.  But King Wen of Chu restored the state after Marquis Ai praised Madam Xī (息妫).  He was succeeded by his son.

References 
 Shiji
 Chinese Wikipedia
 
 

Zhou dynasty nobility
Cai (state)
Chinese prisoners of war
7th-century BC Chinese monarchs